Municipal elections were held in the Canadian province of British Columbia on November 15, 2008.

The following is a list of mayoral races in selected municipalities.

Abbotsford

Burnaby

Campbell River

Castlegar

Central Saanich

Chilliwack

Coldstream

Colwood

Comox

Coquitlam

Courtenay

Cranbrook

Dawson Creek

Delta

Esquimalt

Fort St. John

Hope

Kamloops

Kelowna

Kimberley

Kitimat

Ladysmith

Lake Country

Langford

Langley (city)

Langley (district municipality)

Maple Ridge

Merritt

Mission

Nanaimo

Nelson

New Westminster

North Cowichan

North Saanich

North Vancouver (city)

North Vancouver (district municipality)

Oak Bay

Parksville

Penticton

Pitt Meadows

Port Alberni

Port Coquitlam

Port Moody

Powell River

Prince George

Prince Rupert

Qualicum Beach

Quesnel

Revelstoke

Richmond

Saanich

Salmon Arm

Sechelt

Sidney

Sooke

Spallumcheen

Squamish

Summerland

Surrey

Terrace

Trail

Vancouver

Vernon

Victoria

View Royal

West Vancouver

Whistler

White Rock

Williams Lake

External links
 

Municipal elections in British Columbia
2008 elections in Canada
2008 in British Columbia